Billboard Top Hits: 1977 is a compilation album released by Rhino Records in 1991, featuring ten hit recordings from 1977.

The track lineup includes seven songs that reached the top of the Billboard Hot 100 chart. The remaining three songs each reached the top five of the Hot 100.

Track listing

Track information and credits were taken from the CD liner notes.

References

1991 compilation albums
Billboard Top Hits albums
Rhino Records compilation albums